Pocket Rocket may refer to:

People with the nickname
 Shelly-Ann Fraser-Pryce, a Jamaican track and field sprinter
Steve Joughin, Manx cyclist
 Wayne McCullough, a former professional boxer from Northern Ireland
 Henri Richard,  Canadian professional ice hockey player
 Brent Russell, South African professional rugby union player
 Darren Sadler, a British former strongman competitor
 Short Sleeve Sampson, American Midget professional wrestler

Other uses
 Laminex Pocket Rocket, an American sailboat
 Minibike, a miniature motorcycle

See also 
 
 
 Pocket (disambiguation)
 Rocket (disambiguation)

Nicknames